Naranjipur railway station is a small railway station in Dewas district, Madhya Pradesh. Its code is NRGR.

Background
It serves Naranjipur village. The station consists of one platform.

References

External links

Railway stations in Dewas district
Ratlam railway division